Events in the year 1840 in Portugal.

Incumbents
Monarch: Mary II
Prime Minister: José Travassos Valdez, 1st Count of Bonfim

Births
8 July – Manuel de Arriaga, lawyer and politician (died 1917)

Deaths

7 September — Luís do Rego Barreto, military and colonial administrator (b. 1777).

References

 
1840s in Portugal
Portugal
Years of the 19th century in Portugal
Portugal